David Baron is an American computer scientist, web browser engineer, open web standards author, technology speaker, and open source contributor.  He has written and edits several CSS web standards specifications including CSS Color Module Level 3, CSS Conditional Rules, and several working drafts. He started working on Mozilla in 1998, and was employed by Mozilla in 2003 to help develop and evolve the Gecko rendering engine, eventually as a Distinguished Engineer in 2013. He was Mozilla’s representative on the WHATWG Steering Group from 2017-2020. He has served on the W3C Technical Architecture Group (TAG) continuously since being elected in 2015 and re-elected subsequently, most recently in 2020. In 2021 he joined Google to work on Google Chrome.

Notable inventions 
 Reftests — automated visual tests of browser engine rendering
 CSS animations implementation in Gecko

Writing 
Baron is the author and editor of several W3C web standards:
 CSS Color Module Level 3 Recommendation
 CSS Conditional Rules Module Level 3 Candidate Recommendation
 CSS Animations Level 1 Working Draft
 CSS Overflow Module Level 3 Working Draft
 CSS Transitions Working Draft
Baron was also a technical reviewer of the book "Transitions and Animations in CSS: Adding Motion with CSS".

References

External links

 W3C Interview of David Baron

Mozilla developers
Free software programmers
Open source people
Computer programmers
Living people
Year of birth missing (living people)
American computer scientists
Mozilla people
American bloggers
Harvard School of Engineering and Applied Sciences alumni